Brian Bergkamp is an American accountant and politician serving as a member of the Kansas House of Representatives from the 93rd district. Elected in November 2020, he assumed office on January 11, 2021.

Education 
Bergkamp graduated from Pretty Prairie High School in Pretty Prairie, Kansas, and earned a Bachelor of Science degree in accounting from Friends University.

Career 
After graduating from college in 2008, Bergkamp joined Koch Supply & Trading, a subsidiary of Koch Industries, as a tax analyst. He later worked as a trade accounting analyst and a logistics analyst for Koch Ag & Energy Solutions before working as a marketing supervisor and project manager for Koch Fertilizer. Bergkamp was elected to the Kansas House of Representatives in November 2020 and assumed office on January 11, 2021.

References 

Living people
Year of birth missing (living people)
People from Reno County, Kansas
Friends University alumni
Republican Party members of the Kansas House of Representatives
21st-century American politicians